Kansas City Kitty is a 1944 American romantic musical film directed by Del Lord, starring Joan Davis and Jane Frazee. The film features the singing Williams Brothers, including the youngest of the quartet, Andy Williams.

Cast 
 Joan Davis - Polly Jasper
 Bob Crosby - Jimmy
 Jane Frazee - Eileen Hasbrook
 Erik Rolf - Dr. Henry Talbot
 Tim Ryan - Dave Clark
 Robert Emmett Keane - Joe Lathim
 The Williams Brothers - Speciality Performers
 Ray Walker - Lawyer Simpson
Johnny Bond (uncredited)- Chaps Wiliker

References

External links 
 
 
 

1944 films
1944 musical comedy films
1944 romantic comedy films
American musical comedy films
American romantic comedy films
American romantic musical films
American black-and-white films
Columbia Pictures films
Films set in New York City
1940s romantic musical films
Films directed by Del Lord
1940s English-language films
1940s American films